Homa Hotel Group is the largest hotel chain in Iran, the hotel is a subsidiary of IranAir and Social Security Organization, which owns a chain of five-star hotels in major cities of Iran.

History 
Homa Hotel was founded by The Shah in hopes of boosting tourism in Iran, it was part of the IranAir Group. it originally had plans on building its own hotels in major Iranian cities. After the Iranian Revolution the hotel group managed to purchase hotels formerly operated by larger foreign hotel chains after having to leave Iran.

Overview 

Homa Hotels has more than 1,000 rooms, all of its hotels were constructed prior to the 1979 Revolution with the exception of the 2nd Mashhad Hotel which is the only Homa Hotel that was built by and for Homa Hotels in the late 1990s.

The Hotel has branches in Tehran, Shiraz, Bandar Abbas, 2 in Mashhad, it has had plans on expanding to cities including Isfahan, Tabriz, Chalus, and Kish, however it has recently been more interested in its Isfahan Branch.

Locations 
Homa Hotel Tehran

Previously operated by Arya-Sheraton, the Tehran branch was built and opened in 1974, designed by architect Welton Becket. it has 172 rooms and suites and is located in Vanak. this hotel is by far the most famous hotel in the group and also Tehran.

Homa Hotel Shiraz

This hotel was previously operated by InterContinental as the Kourosh Hotel. the building was later extended under Homa Hotel management bringing up its total room number to 159.

Homa Hotel Bandar Abbas

The Bandar Abbas branch was operated by Hilton Hotel until the  revolution. It is also the only 4 star Hotel operated by Homa Hotel After losing 1 of its star right after being handed to Homa Hotel.

Homa Hotel Mashhad (1)

The Mashhad Hotel in Ahmadabad, commonly known as Mashhad (1). is one out of the two Homa Hotel branches in the city of Mashhad, the 118 room hotel was built for Hyatt Hotel later falling into Homa Management.

Homa Hotel Mashhad (2)

The Khayyam branch is the first and the only Homa Hotel that was built for Homa Hotel and has exclusively remained in operation only with the chain. It has 202 rooms making it the largest Homa Hotel by size.

See also
Tourism in Iran

References

External links

Hotels in Iran
Iran Air
Iranian brands
Hospitality companies of Iran